Arnold Lechler (born 28 April 1991) is a German-Russian footballer who plays as a forward for Oberliga Hamburg club SV Curslack-Neuengamme.

References

External links
 

Living people
1991 births
German footballers
Russian footballers
Association football forwards
SV Eichede players
SG Sonnenhof Großaspach players
Altonaer FC von 1893 players
3. Liga players
Regionalliga players
Oberliga (football) players